FSK may refer to:

 FSK (band), a German band
 Federal Counterintelligence Service, (Russian ) of Russia
 Fiskerton railway station, in England
 Forskolin, a diterpene
 Forsvarets Spesialkommando, a Norwegian special forces unit
 Fort Scott Municipal Airport, in Kansas, United States
 Francis Scott Key Bridge (disambiguation)
 Francis Scott Key High School, in  Union Bridge, Maryland, United States
 Freiwillige Selbstkontrolle der Filmwirtschaft, a German movie rating organization
 Frequency-shift keying
 Friends School Kamusinga, in Kenya
 Kosovo Security Force,